Bochet is a type of mead made from honey that has been caramelized.

It yields a dark, clear mead with a complex flavor. Bochetomel is a bochet-style mead that also contains fruit such as elderberries, black raspberries, and blackberries.

References

Mead